Gagloyev or Gagloev is an Ossetian masculine surname; its feminine counterpart is Gagloyeva or Gagloeva. It may refer to:

 Aleksandr Gagloyev (born 1990), Russian football player
 Fyodor Gagloyev (born 1966), Russian football coach and a former player
 Vadim Gagloyev (born 1989), Russian football player
 Vladimir Gagloyev (1927–1996), Ossetian writer
 Alan Gagloyev (born 1981), Ossetian politician

Ossetian-language surnames